Riding on Air is a 1937 American film directed by Edward Sedgwick.

The film is also known as All Is Confusion in the United Kingdom.

Plot summary
Joe E. Brown plays hapless newspaper writer, editor; amateur pilot, HAM radio operator, and gadget crazy Elmer Lane, in 1930's rural America.  In love with the beautiful Betty, he does everything he can to buy the paper outright; so, he can win her.  But, somehow something always comes out of the blue: gangsters, smugglers, murdered mobsters, rival newspaper reporters, con artists, police, new inventions, and small dogs, all get in the way. It's all "Riding on Air" how this fun, wild, ride, will land, or if the parachute will even open.

Cast
Joe E. Brown - Elmer Lane
Guy Kibbee - J. Rutherford "Doc" Waddington
Florence Rice - Betty Harrison
Vinton Hayworth - Harvey Schuman
Anthony Nace - Bill Hilton
Harlan Briggs - Mr. Harrison
Andrew Tombes - Eddie Byrd
Clem Bevans - Sheriff
Harry C. Bradley - Mayor

Soundtrack
"I'm Tired of Trying to Make You Care" (Written by Henry Cohen and Edward Sedgwick)

External links

1937 films
1937 comedy films
1930s English-language films
American black-and-white films
American comedy films
Films produced by David L. Loew
Films directed by Edward Sedgwick
American aviation films
1930s American films